Mystic River is a 2003 American neo-noir crime drama film directed and co-produced by Clint Eastwood, and starring Sean Penn, Tim Robbins, Kevin Bacon, Laurence Fishburne, Marcia Gay Harden and Laura Linney. The screenplay, written by Brian Helgeland, was based on the 2001 novel of the same name by Dennis Lehane. It is the first film in which Eastwood was credited as composer of the score.

In addition to being a critical and commercial success, Mystic River was nominated for six awards at the 76th Academy Awards for Best Picture, Best Director, Best Actor for Penn, Best Adapted Screenplay, Best Supporting Actress for Harden, and Best Supporting Actor for Robbins. Penn and Robbins won in their respective categories, making Mystic River the first film to win both awards since Ben-Hur in 1959 and last until Dallas Buyers Club in 2013.

Plot
In 1975, Irish-American friends Jimmy Markum, Sean Devine, and Dave Boyle are playing hockey in a Boston street. After deciding to write a mural of their names on a patch of wet concrete, two men, claiming to be police officers, kidnap Dave and sexually abuse him for four days until he escapes. 

Twenty-five years later, Jimmy is an ex-convict and neighborhood convenience store owner; Sean is a detective with the Massachusetts State Police whose pregnant wife Lauren recently left him, and Dave is a blue-collar worker continually haunted by the abduction and rape. Jimmy and Dave are related by marriage, Dave's wife Celeste and Jimmy's second wife Annabeth being cousins. 
 
Jimmy's daughter from his first marriage, Katie, plans to run away to Las Vegas with Brendan Harris, a boy from a family Jimmy despises whom she has been secretly dating. One night, Dave sees Katie and her friends at a local bar. That same night, Katie is murdered, and Dave comes home bloodied and injured. He tells his wife that he fought off a mugger and possibly killed him.

Sean and his partner Whitey Powers investigate the murder while Jimmy, distraught at his daughter's death, conducts a separate investigation using his neighborhood connections. 

Sean discovers that Katie recognized her killer and that the gun used to kill her, a .38 Special revolver, was also used in a liquor store robbery in 1984 by "Just Ray" Harris, the father of Brendan. Harris has been missing since 1989, but Brendan claims he still sends his family $500 monthly. Brendan feigns ignorance about Ray's gun. Whitey suspects Dave, who keeps changing the story about his hand being injured. Dave continues to behave erratically, which upsets Celeste to the point that she leaves their home and tells Jimmy she suspects Dave might be involved in the murder.

Jimmy and his friends invite Dave to a local bar, get him drunk and confront him when he is about to vomit. Jimmy admits to Dave that he killed "Just Ray" for implicating him in the liquor store robbery, which resulted in his imprisonment. Dave reveals to Jimmy that he did kill someone that night, but it was not Katie. He beat to death a child molester whom he found with a child prostitute. Jimmy does not believe Dave and pulls out a knife. He promises to let Dave live if he confesses to Katie's murder. However, when Dave admits to killing Katie, Jimmy kills him and disposes of his body in the adjacent Mystic River.

Meanwhile, after finding his father's gun missing, Brendan confronts his mute younger brother "Silent Ray" and his friend John O'Shea about Katie's murder. Brendan beats the two boys, trying to get them to admit their guilt, and then John pulls out Ray's gun and is about to shoot Brendan. Sean and Whitey, having connected the two boys to the murder, arrive and disarm and arrest John and Ray.

The next morning, Sean tells Jimmy that John and "Silent Ray" confessed to killing Katie as part of a prank gone wrong. Sean asks Jimmy if he has seen Dave, who is wanted for questioning in the murder of a known child molester. Jimmy does not answer, instead thanking Sean for finding Katie's killers, but remarks, "if only you'd be a little faster." Sean then asks Jimmy if he intends to send Celeste a monthly $500.

Sean reunites with Lauren after apologizing for pushing her away while Jimmy confesses what he's done to Annabeth, who tells him he is "a king, and a king knows what to do and does it. Even when it's hard." During a local parade, Dave's son Michael waits for his father.  Sean sees Jimmy and mimics a gunshot at him with his hand, whereas Jimmy spreads his arms in a "can't help it" gesture.

Cast

Production
Principal photography took place on location in Boston. Eastwood stated that the three lead actors were his first choices for the roles.

Release

Critical response
On Rotten Tomatoes, the film has an approval rating of 88% based on 206 reviews, with an average rating of 7.80/10. The site's critics consensus reads: "Anchored by the exceptional acting of its strong cast, Mystic River is a somber drama that unfolds in layers and conveys the tragedy of its story with visceral power." On Metacritic, the film has a weighted average score of 84 out of 100, based on reviews from 42 critics, indicating "universal acclaim". Audiences polled by CinemaScore gave the film an average grade of "B+" on an A+ to F scale.

Peter Travers of Rolling Stone wrote "Clint Eastwood pours everything he knows about directing into Mystic River. His film sneaks up, messes with your head, and then floors you. You can't shake it. It's that haunting, that hypnotic."

On September 8, 2003, David Edelstein wrote a long article for The New York Times with the headline: "Dirty Harry Wants to Say He's Sorry (Again)." The piece examines Mystic River in the context of Eastwood's entire oeuvre, raising questions about the portrayal of violence in film.

Reviewing the film for The New York Times on October 3, 2003, A.O. Scott wrote a long review of this "mighty" work, at one point observing: "Dave's abduction is an act of inexplicable, almost metaphysical evil, and this story of guilt, grief and vengeance grows out of it like a mass of dark weeds. At its starkest, the film, like the novel by Dennis Lehane on which it is based, is a parable of incurable trauma, in which violence begets more violence and the primal violation of innocence can never be set right. Mystic River is the rare American movie that aspires to—and achieves—the full weight and darkness of tragedy."

On October 12, 2003, The New York Times A. O. Scott wrote a piece headlined "Ms. Macbeth and her cousin: The women of Mystic River" which he opened with: "One of the most haunting scenes in Clint Eastwood's Mystic River—a film that consists almost entirely of haunting scenes—comes just before the end. The main dramatic action, we have every reason to suspect, is complete... A long, climactic night of revelation and confrontation is over, and the weary streets of Boston are flooded with hard autumnal light. The break of day brings a new insight, one that has less to do with the facts of the story than with its meaning. All along, Mystic River has seemed, most obviously, to be about those three men... But it turns out to be just as much about three (or more) damaged families, about the terror and mystery of marriage and about the fateful actions of two women."

In the New York Times, on June 8, 2004, anticipating the DVD and CD release, Dave Kehr praised the film as "a symphonic study in contrasting voices and values. Long fascinated by music as a subject,... Mr. Eastwood here creates a genuinely musical style, using his performers like soloists, from Mr. Robbins's moody baritone to Mr. Penn's spiky soprano. Their individual arias are incorporated into a magnificent choral piece".

Box office
The film earned $156,822,020 worldwide with $90,135,191 in the United States and $66,686,829 in the international box office, which is significantly higher than the film's $25–30 million budget.

Accolades

References

Bibliography
 
 
 Ostermann, Eberhard. Mystic River oder die Abwesenheit des Vaters. In: E.O.: Die Filmerzählung. Acht exemplarische Analysen. Munich (Fink) 2007. pp. 29–43. .

External links
 
 
 
 

2003 films
2003 crime drama films
2003 crime thriller films
2003 psychological thriller films
2003 thriller drama films
2000s mystery drama films
2000s mystery thriller films
2000s psychological drama films
American crime drama films
American crime thriller films
American films about revenge
Films about child sexual abuse
American mystery drama films
American mystery thriller films
American neo-noir films
American psychological drama films
American psychological thriller films
American thriller drama films
2000s English-language films
Best Foreign Film César Award winners
American detective films
Fictional portrayals of the Boston Police Department
Films about death
Films about families
Films about Irish-American culture
Films about pedophilia
Films based on American crime novels
Films based on works by Dennis Lehane
Films directed by Clint Eastwood
Films featuring a Best Actor Academy Award-winning performance
Films featuring a Best Drama Actor Golden Globe winning performance
Films featuring a Best Supporting Actor Academy Award-winning performance
Films featuring a Best Supporting Actor Golden Globe winning performance
Films produced by Clint Eastwood
Films produced by Robert Lorenz
Films scored by Clint Eastwood
Films set in 1975
Films set in 2000
Films set in Boston
Films shot in Boston
Films with screenplays by Brian Helgeland
Malpaso Productions films
Village Roadshow Pictures films
Warner Bros. films
Films about post-traumatic stress disorder
2000s American films